The 17233 / 17234 Bhagyanagar Express is an oldest Express train in India which runs between Secunderabad Junction in Telangana and  in Maharashtra. After Covid-19 train has short terminated at Sirpur Kaghaznagar railway station. It was introduced on November 1, 1970.The Vijayawada railway division of the South Central Railway division of the Indian Railways administers this train.

Numbering

Route

Rake sharing
The train has rake sharing with 17201/17202 Golconda Express

Loco
The train is generally hauled by a Lallaguda-based WAP-7 locomotive on its entire journey.

Classes
The 21 coach composition contains: 1 AC chair car, 3 second class sitting, 14 general, 3 SLR.

See also
 Visakhapatnam Swarna Jayanti Express
 Padmavati Express
 Warangal
 Rudrama Devi
 Bahubali

References
 
 

Transport in Secunderabad
Railway services introduced in 2004
Named passenger trains of India
Rail transport in Telangana
Rail transport in Maharashtra
Express trains in India